Gateway Airport may refer to:

 Phoenix-Mesa Gateway Airport, an airport located 20 miles southeast of Phoenix, Arizona
 Kissimmee Gateway Airport, an airport located 16 miles southwest of Orlando, Florida
 Sioux Gateway Airport, an airport located in Sioux Falls, Iowa